State Route 66 (SR 66) is a state highway in the U.S. state of California that runs along a section of old U.S. Route 66 in Los Angeles and San Bernardino counties. It goes from State Route 210 in La Verne east to Interstate 215 in San Bernardino, passing through Claremont, Upland, Rancho Cucamonga, Fontana and Rialto along Foothill Boulevard. In San Bernardino, it is the part of Fifth Street west of H Street (at the Interstate 215 interchange).

Route description
The route begins as Foothill Boulevard at the interchange with SR 210 in the city of La Verne. SR 66 heads southeast for a few miles before entering Pomona and turning due east. The highway continues into the city of Claremont, passing by Claremont Colleges, before crossing into Upland, San Bernardino County.

In Upland, SR 66 passes by Cable Airport to the south, continuing due east. The highway intersects SR 83 before entering Rancho Cucamonga, where state maintenance of SR 66 currently ends. Foothill Boulevard continues east through Rancho Cucamonga through an interchange with I-15 before entering Fontana, and passing well north of the California Speedway. Foothill Boulevard continues east into Rialto, where the SR 66 designation resumes. SR 66 continues east into San Bernardino, before curving to the north as 5th Street and terminating at I-215 south of downtown.

California's legislature has relinquished state control of the segment from the Pomona–Claremont line east to the Fontana–Rialto line, and turned it over to local control.

SR 66 is part of the California Freeway and Expressway System, although it is neither a freeway nor an expressway. SR 66 is part of the National Highway System, a network of highways that are considered essential to the country's economy, defense, and mobility by the Federal Highway Administration.

History

As a state route, SR 66 was added to the state highway system in the 1964 state highway renumbering, from SR 30 around San Dimas to San Bernardino. By 2013, the portion from east of Pomona to the eastern boundary of Rialto had been relinquished to the various cities that the route passed through.

Major intersections

Notes

See also

References

External links

California @ AARoads.com - State Route 66
Caltrans: Route 66 highway conditions
California Highways: SR 66

066
U.S. Route 66 in California
State Route 066
State Route 066
Transportation in San Bernardino, California
Pomona Valley
Geography of Pomona, California
Claremont, California
Fontana, California
La Verne, California
Rancho Cucamonga, California
Rialto, California
Upland, California